Leptoteratura is a genus of Asian bush crickets belonging to the tribe Meconematini in the subfamily Meconematinae. They are found in Japan, China (including Taiwan), Vietnam, and Malesia.

Species 
The Orthoptera Species File lists the following species:
 Leptoteratura albicornis (Motschulsky, 1866)– type species (as Meconema albicorne Motschulsky)
 Leptoteratura cemande Gorochov, 2008
 Leptoteratura digitata Yamasaki, 1987
 Leptoteratura emarginata Liu, 2004
 Leptoteratura gialai Gorochov, 2008
 Leptoteratura jona Yamasaki, 1987
 Leptoteratura kevani Gorochov, 1998
 Leptoteratura koncharangi Gorochov, 1998
 Leptoteratura martynovi Gorochov, 1998
 Leptoteratura sugonjaevi Gorochov, 1994
 Leptoteratura taiwana Yamasaki, 1987
 Leptoteratura triura Liu, 1997
 Leptoteratura yaeyamana Yamasaki, 1987 (2 subspecies)

Note: before 2022, the genus Rhinoteratura was placed here as the subgenus Leptoteratura (Rhinoteratura).

References

External links

 Image on gaga.biodiv.tw (retrieved 9 May 2019)

Tettigoniidae genera
Meconematinae
Orthoptera of Asia